The fifth season of the reality television series Love & Hip Hop: Hollywood aired on VH1 from July 23, 2018 until November 19, 2018. It was primarily filmed in Los Angeles, California. It is executively produced by Mona Scott-Young, Stephanie Gayle and Treiva Williams for Monami Entertainment, Toby Barraud, Stefan Springman, Dave Patry, David DiGangi, Rich Allen and Michael Lang for Eastern TV, and Nina L. Diaz, Liz Fine, Vivian Gomez and Jihoon Zun for VH1.

The series chronicles the lives of several women and men in the Los Angeles area, involved in hip hop music. It consists of 18 episodes, including a two-part reunion special hosted by Nina Parker.

Production 

Season five of Love & Hip Hop: Hollywood began filming in February 2018.

On June 18, 2018, VH1 announced Love & Hip Hop: Hollywood would be returning for a fifth season on July 23, 2018, along with a teaser confirming Love & Hip Hop: Atlantas K. Michelle had joined the cast. Unlike her appearances on Love & Hip Hop: Atlanta and Love & Hip Hop: New York, K. is credited under her birth name, Kimberly. This season featured an entirely new opening credits sequence. Season five saw the promotion of A1 Bentley and Brooke Valentine to the main cast after previously appearing as supporting cast members. New cast members include video vixen Apple Watts, singer La'Britney, K. Michelle: My Lifes Paris Phillips, Grammy Award-nominated producer RoccStar, manager Shun Love, model Amber Diamond, bisexual rapper and drag performer JayWill and media personality Donatella. Although not included in the initial cast announcement, Apple's father John Watts would appear in a minor supporting role.

On July 3, VH1 released an extended teaser with the season's tagline "get the truth behind the headlines". The season's promotional videos would all follow a tabloid-themed aesthetic, with images of cast members paired with lurid headlines and set to Marvin Gaye's "I Heard It Through the Grapevine". On July 6, 2018, VH1 began releasing "meet the cast" interview promos featuring new cast members Apple Watts, La'Britney, Paris Phillips, RoccStar and Shun Love. On July 16, 2018, VH1 released a 5-minute super-trailer.

On August 30, 2018, it was announced that Princess and Ray J would star in their own special, Love & Hip Hop Hollywood: Ray J & Princess’ Labor of Love, which would air on September 24, 2018, and document the birth of their child.

Synopsis

Reception 
Despite continuing the franchise's overall ratings decline, the season's over-the-top storylines were well received by fans and critics, with Ziwe Fumudoh of Vulture giving the fifth and seventh episodes perfect scores. Writer Michael Arceneaux praised the season for providing a "ratchet good time" and "making Love & Hip Hop great again".

Cast

Starring 

 K. Michelle (12 episodes)
 Teairra Marí (15 episodes)
 Moniece Slaughter (15 episodes)
 Nikki Mudarris (13 episodes)
 Brooke Valentine (17 episodes)
 Lyrica Anderson (14 episodes)
 A1 Bentley (14 episodes)
 Princess Love (10 episodes)
 Ray J (11 episodes)

Also starring 

 Bridget Kelly (13 episodes)
 Solo Lucci (9 episodes)
 Apple Watts (14 episodes)
 A.D. Diggs (5 episodes)
 Paris Phillips (16 episodes)
 Marcus Black (15 episodes)
 Donatella (6 episodes)
 Lil' Fizz (4 episodes)
 RoccStar (12 episodes)
 Pam Bentley (8 episodes)
 Lyrica Garrett (10 episodes)
 La'Britney (12 episodes)
 JayWill (8 episodes)
 Amber Diamond (8 episodes)
 Shun Love (11 episodes)
 Misster Ray (6 episodes)
 John Watts (6 episodes)

Safaree Samuels and Daniel "Booby" Gibson return in guest roles, while Stassia Thomas, Loyd Bentley, Akbar Abdul-Ahad, Patrice Bentley, Sade Abdul-Ahad and Alejandra Perez appear as guest stars in several episodes. The show also features minor appearances from notable figures within the hip hop industry and Hollywood's social scene, including Sonja Norwood, Brandy Norwood, Willie Norwood, Tiffany Campbell, Lisa Bloom, Lady Leshurr, Love & Hip Hop: Miamis Amara La Negra and Kash Doll.

Episodes

Webisodes

Check Yourself 
Love & Hip Hop Hollywood: Check Yourself, which features the cast's reactions to each episode, was released weekly with every episode on digital platforms.

Bonus scenes 
Deleted scenes from the season's episodes were released weekly as bonus content on VH1's official website.

Music 

Several cast members had their music featured on the show and released singles to coincide with the airing of the episodes.

References

External links 

 
 

2018 American television seasons
Love & Hip Hop